The Abary River (Abary Creek) is a small river in northern Guyana that drains into the Atlantic Ocean.

Historic Amerindian settlements existed at Tiger Island and Taurakuli. The upper Abary River, the site of which now lies under the reservoir created by the Mahaica-Mahaicony-Abary project in the 1970s.

In 1672, under an arrangement between the Commander of Essequibo and the Secretary of the Government of Berbice, it was agreed that the Abary River would be the western boundary of the Colony of Berbice.

Rice farming and cattle are the major economic activities in proximity to the river.

It is home to manatees, some of which were moved to Georgetown's National Park and Botanical Garden .

See also 

 List of rivers of Guyana
 Agriculture in Guyana
 Abary - Place in Mahaica-Berbice, Guyana

References

Rivers of Guyana
History of Guyana